Balowlan (also Romanized as Bālowlān) is a village in Targavar Rural District, Silvaneh District, Urmia County, West Azerbaijan Province, Iran. , its population its 309, with 57 families.

References 

Populated places in Urmia County